Saris and the City is a 2010 romantic novel written by Rekha Waheed about a career-driven woman looking for a suitable husband.

Plot summary
Yasmin Yusuf is a thirty-year-old, independent, woman from a culturally conservative, traditional Bengali family with a career working in an equity firm in London. She has her life planned out and knows what she wants. She meets her Bengali boyfriend, Sam, for a meal and is sure he is going to propose, she rushes her work and makes a damning mistake on the report her private banker boss, Zachary Khan, has asked her to prepare for an important meeting. Zach fires her the following day. Yasmin breaks down and tearfully tells him that her expected engagement did not happen and pleads with him to give her another chance. Unable to do so, he tells her to take a week off and arranges for her to be transferred to another branch of the firm.

Still living at home with her widowed father, Yasmin is determined not to cause him concern and pretends everything is fine. Despite being devastated by the change in her circumstances, she also does not want the extra worry of her protective older brothers finding out what her ex-boyfriend has done to her as she thinks they will want to take revenge on him. She starts her new job, but ends up at the mercy of Zachary 's senior advisor Hannah Gibbs-Smythson, a no nonsense woman who does not intend making Yasmin welcome.

Yasmin is seen as easy target by several of her new colleagues and is soon deceived into carrying out research that was intended to humiliate her. She is given the job of restoring the fortunes of a lingerie company and gets to know the young woman in charge and intends to help the lacklustre business thrive once again. When Yasmin falls out with her closest friends over a misunderstanding, she jumps at the chance of joining several members of her team on a two-week working trip to Dubai. It is while she is there things culminate and Yasmin discovers that everything is not all it seems both at work and with Zachary Khan.

Themes
Saris and the City'''s title plays on the American television romantic sitcom Sex and the City as the main character, Yasmin Yusuf, has a group of Sex and the City-style friends.

ReleaseSaris and the City was released by Little Black Dress on 15 April 2010.

Critical response
Jaya Bhattacharji Rose of Friends Of Books blog said, "Saris and the City is breezy, chatty and pure fun to read..." Nicky Cole of TheBookbag.co.uk said, "Overall, I found this book highly readable and enjoyed my first experience of Rekha Waheed's writing."

Debs Carr of Novelicious.com'' rated the novel 8/10 and said, "This was a lovely story. I enjoyed reading about Yasmin's difficulties trying to conform within the expectations of her Bengali family, whilst at the same time working in a cut-throat industry."

See also
Courtship
British Bangladeshi

References

External links
Saris in the City on Google Books

2010 British novels
English-language novels
Bengali-language novels
English novels
Novels by Rekha Waheed
Bangladeshi diaspora in the United Kingdom
Sex and the City